Live from London may refer to:

Albums
 Live from London (Bill Anderson album), 1975
 Live from London, by Gary Moore, 2020

EPs
 Live from London (Natalie Imbruglia EP), 2007
 Live from London (R.E.M. EP), 2008
 Live from London EP, by Stereophonics, 2005
 Live from London, by Duffy, 2008

Videos
 Live from London (Bon Jovi video), 1995
 Live from London (Duran Duran), a 2005
 Live from London (Steve Harley & Cockney Rebel video), 1985
 Live from London 2006, by the Fantômas Melvins Big Band
 Justin Timberlake: Live from London, 2003
 Lindsey Stirling: Live from London, 2015
 PCD Live from London, by the Pussycat Dolls, 2006
 Live from London, by Jim Bob, 2005

See also
 iTunes Live from London (disambiguation)